Loyno is a rural locality (a selo) in Verkhnekamsky District of Kirov Oblast, Russia, located  northeast of Kirov along the Kama River.  Postal code: 612834; dialing code: (+7) 83339.

External links
Loyno in the World City Database

Rural localities in Kirov Oblast
Slobodskoy Uyezd